The Musée de la Publicité was a museum of advertising history located in the Louvre's Rohan and Marsan wings, 1st arrondissement of Paris, at 107, rue de Rivoli, Paris, France.

The museum first opened in 1978 as the Musée de l’Affiche, and is now a department of the Musée des Arts Décoratifs, Paris. Works from the former museum are regularly displayed in temporary exhibitions.

Collections
The museum focused on advertisements. It contained about 50,000 posters dating between the 18th century and World War II, with a further 50,000 posters dating from the 1950s to the present, over 20,000 film advertisements, more than 30,000 newspaper and magazine advertisements, as well as radio advertisements and promotional items.

See also 
 List of museums in Paris

References 

 Musée de la Publicité
 Paris.org entry
 ParisInfo entry

Defunct museums in Paris
Advertising museums
Decorative arts museums in France
Art museums established in 1978
Musee de la Publicite
Musee de la Publicite
Louvre Palace
Buildings and structures in the 1st arrondissement of Paris
Les Arts Décoratifs